Túlio Vinícius Fróes de Melo (born 31 January 1985) is a Brazilian footballer who plays as a striker.

Career

Early career & Breakthrough (2003–08) 
Túlio de Melo started his career with Atlético Mineiro, and moved to Europe in 2004 to join Danish top-flight team Aalborg BK on loan. In 2005, he signed a three-year contract with French club Le Mans, where he gained a reputation as a powerful striker with the ability to lob keepers of international class from range. His impressive performances in the first half of the 2007–08 season (10 goals in 19 matches) caused interest from higher-level teams, namely Serie A clubs Palermo and Parma. His name later caused controversy between these teams as it appeared he actually signed contracts with both clubs, but eventually it was Palermo who finalized his signing. Palermo paid the agent "SCMG Sport Consulting & Management Gmbh" €3.8 million to sign his outright.

Palermo/France 
Túlio de Melo joined the Rosanero in July 2008, but he was soon listed for transfer by the club, and managed only to play 45 minutes in a Coppa Italia match, a 2–1 home loss to Ravenna.

On 31 August 2008 Ligue 1 club Lille announced to have completed the signing of Túlio de Melo from Palermo, for €4 million.

Túlio de Melo left Lille in January 2014, signing with Evian Thonon Gaillard. However, he only appeared in five matches, and was subsequently released.

Valladolid 
On 29 January 2015 Túlio de Melo signed a six-month deal with Spanish Segunda División side Real Valladolid.

Honours
Lille
Ligue 1: 2010–11
Coupe de France: 2010–11

Chapecoense
 Campeonato Catarinense: 2017

References

External links

1985 births
Living people
Sportspeople from Minas Gerais
Brazilian footballers
Association football forwards
Campeonato Brasileiro Série A players
Clube Atlético Mineiro players
Associação Chapecoense de Futebol players
Sport Club do Recife players
Danish Superliga players
AaB Fodbold players
Ligue 1 players
Le Mans FC players
Lille OSC players
Thonon Evian Grand Genève F.C. players
Palermo F.C. players
Segunda División players
Real Valladolid players
Brazilian expatriate footballers
Expatriate men's footballers in Denmark
Brazilian expatriate sportspeople in Denmark
Expatriate footballers in Italy
Brazilian expatriate sportspeople in Italy
Expatriate footballers in France
Brazilian expatriate sportspeople in France
Expatriate footballers in Spain
Brazilian expatriate sportspeople in Spain
Expatriate footballers in Japan
Brazilian expatriate sportspeople in Japan